Nils Gustav Henry "Garvis" Carlsson (29 October 1917 – 28 May 1999), was a Swedish professional footballer who played as a forward. He represented AIK, Stade Français, and Atletico Madrid during a club career that spanned between 1939 and 1953. A full international between 1941 and 1949, he won 26 caps for the Sweden national team and was part of the Sweden Olympic team that won the gold medal at the 1948 Summer Olympics.

Personal life 
He was the father of Björn Carlsson, who also represented AIK in Allsvenskan and played for the Sweden national team.

Career statistics

International 

 Scores and results list Sweden's goal tally first, score column indicates score after each Carlsson goal.

Honours 
Atletico Madrid

 La Liga: 1949–50, 1950–51
 Copa Eva Duarte: 1951 (Predecessor to the Supercopa de España)
Sweden

 Summer Olympics: 1948
Individual
 Stor Grabb: 1943

References

Sources
 
 Profile at AIK
 
 

1917 births
1999 deaths
Swedish football managers
AIK Fotboll managers
AIK Fotboll players
Atlético Madrid footballers
Footballers at the 1948 Summer Olympics
Allsvenskan players
La Liga players
Olympic footballers of Sweden
Olympic gold medalists for Sweden
Stade Français (association football) players
Ligue 1 players
Sweden international footballers
Swedish footballers
Expatriate footballers in France
Expatriate footballers in Spain
IF Brommapojkarna managers
Olympic medalists in football
Swedish expatriate sportspeople in France
Swedish expatriate sportspeople in Spain
Medalists at the 1948 Summer Olympics
Association football forwards
20th-century Swedish people